Fidel Alexander Monterrosa Muñoz (born 25 July 1988) is a Colombian professional boxer who challenged for the WBC lightweight title in 2010.

Professional career
In August 2008, Muñoz beat the undefeated Oscar Cuero to win the Colombian National lightweight title.

On 18 September 2010, Muñoz lost to WBC lightweight champion Humberto Soto over twelve rounds.

References

External links

Living people
1988 births
Colombian male boxers
Light-welterweight boxers